The 2019 NBA Awards were the 3rd annual awards show by the National Basketball Association (NBA), held on June 24, 2019, at Barker Hangar in Santa Monica, California and hosted by Shaquille O’Neal.

Winners and finalists
The full list of finalists were announced on May 17, 2019.

Winners are in boldface.

Honors
The NBA All-Rookie Teams were announced on May 21, 2019. It was followed by the announcements for the NBA All-Defensive Teams on May 22, 2019 and the All-NBA Teams on May 23, 2019.

NBA All-Rookie Team

NBA All-Defensive Team

All NBA Team

See also
List of National Basketball Association awards

References

External links

NBA Awards
2018–19 NBA season
2019 awards in the United States
2019 sports awards
2019 in Los Angeles County, California